Jol or JOL may refer to:

People 
 Cornelis Jol (1597–1641), Dutch corsair and admiral during the Eighty Years' War
 Dick Jol (born 1956), Dutch football referee
 Jutta Jol (1896–1981), German actress
 Martin Jol (born 1956), Dutch football manager and former player
 Jol Dantzig, American artist and musician

Other uses 
 Cherchell, a town in Algeria with the Roman name Jol
 Jol, a kind of embroidered Kilim flatweave rug for use as a horse saddle
 Jol (film), a 2001 Kazakhstani drama
 Jól (Iceland), the Christmas holiday season in Iceland
 Jol, Iran
 Jolo Airport, in Sulu, Philippines, with IATA code JOL
 Journal of Luminescence, a peer-reviewed scientific journal
 Yule, an ancient Germanic winter celebration